Adolfo Orive Bellinger (born 13 August 1940) is a Mexican politician formerly affiliated with the Labor Party (Previously to the PRI).  he served as Deputy of the LXII Legislature of the Mexican Congress representing the Federal District.

References

1940 births
Living people
Politicians from Tijuana
Members of the Chamber of Deputies (Mexico)
Institutional Revolutionary Party politicians
Labor Party (Mexico) politicians
21st-century Mexican politicians
National Autonomous University of Mexico alumni
University of Paris alumni
Academic staff of the National Autonomous University of Mexico
Members of the Congress of Mexico City